RAFO Musannah , is a Royal Air Force of Oman air base located  south west of Barka, Al Batinah South, Oman.

History

Work started on the new air base in 2005 initially with the building of a helicopter apron and hangar to the northwest of the present runway, this was followed by the construction of the runway and two concrete aprons (one to north and one to the northeast) during 2008 and 2009. Work on the southern side started during 2010 and a consisted on a large apron, hangar and additional smaller buildings. During 2012 the southern apron was extended by 25% adding two extra parking stands and another entrance to the taxiway.

Between 2009 and 2011 accommodation was built for the personnel of the new NHIndustries NH90's coming into service.

Current use

NHIndustries NH90's are based here.

During May 2015 it was announced that No. 902 Expeditionary Air Wing RAF has deployed to the base with the Royal Navy's AgustaWestland Merlin HM.2's as part of Operation Kipion.

References

Royal Air Force of Oman